The 2022–23 season is the 83rd season in the existence of RKC Waalwijk and the club's fourth consecutive season in the top flight of Dutch football. In addition to the domestic league, RKC Waalwijk are participating in this season's edition of the KNVB Cup.

Players

Out on loan

Pre-season and friendlies

Competitions

Overall record

Eredivisie

League table

Results summary

Results by round

Matches 
The league fixtures were announced on 17 June 2022.

KNVB Cup

References 

RKC Waalwijk seasons
RKC Waalwijk